Via Carota is an Italian restaurant in the West Village neighborhood in New York City. Via Carota was founded by married restaurateurs Jody Williams and Rita Sodi.

History
The owners of Via Carota, Jody Williams and Rita Sodi, had previously respectively founded the restaurants Buvette and I Sodi. Via Carota was the first restaurant the pair founded together; they have since opened the restaurant Commerce Inn and the bar Bar Pisellino. Before Via Carota opened, Williams and Sodi hosted a party in the restaurant for employees of Buvette and I Sodi to ensure the space was functional. Via Carota opened in November 2014. Via Carota is located in the West Village, near I Sodi and Buvette. Sodi and Williams named the restaurant after a street in an Italian town where Sodi previously lived.

Via Carota expanded in 2016, leasing a space next to the existing restaurant. Sodi and Williams began selling Via Carota-branded pre-bottled cocktails in 2023.

Reception and accolades

Reception
The restaurant has received positive reviews from critics, including Pete Wells of The New York Times. Wells compared the restaurant favorably to Buvette and I Sodi, praising Via Carota for avoiding Buvette's "preciousness" while retaining the dedication to high-quality pasta found at I Sodi. Wells awarded the restaurant two stars.

Robert Sietsema, writing for Eater, also gave the restaurant a positive review.

Reputation
The restaurant has remained popular since it opened. Hannah Goldfield, writing for The New Yorker, referred to the restaurant as "a restaurant person’s restaurant". Instagram account DeuxMoi, which focuses on celebrity gossip and sightings, frequently posts about famous clientele at Via Carota and nearby restaurant Carbone. Samin Nosrat has said the restaurant is her favorite in New York City.

Accolades
In 2019, for their work at Via Carota, Williams and Sodi were both given the award for "Best Chef" in New York City at the annual James Beard Foundation Awards. Writing for Bloomberg, Tejal Rao included the restaurant on her list of the "Best New Restaurants of 2015".

References

2014 establishments in New York City
Italian restaurants in New York City
West Village
Restaurants established in 2014

External links